Ulearum sagittatum is a species in the family Araceae. It is endemic to western Brazil and Peru, where it grows on the forest floor from small rhizomes. Its binomial name refers to the sagittate, meaning arrowhead-shaped, form of its leaves.

References

External links
 Description and photos, from the International Aroid Society

Aroideae
Plants described in 1905